The Freedom and Direct Democracy leadership election of 2015 was held on 4 August 2015. Tomio Okamura was elected the first leader of the party.

Background
Tomio Okamura was the leader of Dawn of Direct Democracy but had to leave the party in early 2015 due to conflicts. Okamura then decided to form new party called Freedom and Direct Democracy. Leadership election was scheduled for August 2015.

Voting
Voting took place on 4 August 2015. Okamura was the only candidate. He was reportedly elected the new leader but no reports of vote count were made public.

References

Freedom and Direct Democracy leadership elections
Freedom and Direct Democracy leadership election
Freedom and Direct Democracy leadership election
Freedom and Direct Democracy leadership election